Namosi is one of Fiji's fourteen provinces and one of eight based in Viti Levu, the largest island. Located to the west of Suva, the province covers 570 square kilometers. Its population of 7,871 at the 2017 census was the second smallest of any Fijian province.

Infrastructure
Namosi Province includes Namosi District, as well as the districts of Veivatuloa and Wainikoroiluva.

The province is governed by a Provincial Council, chaired by Ratu Kiniviliame Taukeinikoro. The Paramount Chieftain of Namosi is The Turaga Na Tui Namosi, Ratu Suliano Matanitobua.

Namosi has 1 Town within its boundaries shared with Serua Province which is Navua Town

Development
Namosi has explored the potential of generating its own hydro-electricity; France has offered to support this multimillion-dollar project now waiting approval from national authorities. Namosi has the potential to generate revenue by mining copper, but more in-depth research into environmental impact and sustainability is needed.

In mid-2016 the first hotel licence was registered for Namosi Province, for the new "unplugged" Namosi Eco Retreat that is a reconstructed Fijian village authentically built using traditional building methods and materials. This eco retreat is situated at Navunikabi Village in the district of Wainikoroiluva.

Geography

A major fault line runs through Viti Levu. Part of this fault line runs between the Navua and Waidina rivers, which were once a single river but now are separate due to ancient seismo-tectonic events. The Namosi Gorge separates these rivers.

Notes and references
 The Pacific Way: A Memoir, page 39, by Kamisese Mara, 1997, reference to the Tui Namosi and Namosi the province
 Memoirs by Polynesian Society, by Polynesian Society (N.Z.), pages 39, 40, 41, published 1945 Indian Botanical Society, original from the University of Michigan, digitized May 19, 2006, reference to the title of the Tui Namosi and the Province of Namosi
 Fiji, page 166, by Korina Miller, Robyn Jones, Leonardo Pinheiro, 2003, Lonely Planet

References

External links
 Reference to Namosi Province.
 Accommodation and first hotel licence Namosi Eco Retreat
 Potential Mining
 A statistical map of Viti Levu shows the province of Namosi
 Reference to the Namosi Gorge

 
Namosi
Namosi